1999 World Cup can refer to:
 1999 Cricket World Cup
 1999 Rugby World Cup
 1999 FIFA Women's World Cup
 1999 Alpine Skiing World Cup
 1999 World Cup of Golf